Palode is a town in Thiruvananthapuram district in the Indian state of Kerala. Palode is surrounded by Western Ghats. Jawaharlal Nehru Tropical Botanic Garden and Research Institute is situated near Palode. Palode is town in Thiruvananthapuram-Thenmala -Shenkottai  State Highway 2 (Kerala). Palode is a town located in Nedumangad Taluk of Thiruvananthapuram district in Kerala.

Place of Interest and Tourism near Palode are Jawaharlal Nehru Tropical Botanical Garden, Mankayam Ecotourism, Brimore Tourism, Lower Meenmutty Hydel Tourism Centre Nanniyode

Demographics
Palode is a town located in Nedumangad Taluk of Thiruvananthapuram district in Kerala. Palode had a population of 14,922 in 2011 with 7,005 males and 7,917 females. Total female population is 53.1%. Scheduled Tribe population is 4.2%. Scheduled caste population is 10.1%. Total Literacy rate is 84.3% (2011). Working population of Palode is 38.8%.

Geography 
Palode is located 8.7033N 77.0264E. Vamanapuram river passes through Palode. Palode is surrounded by Peringammala, Nanniyode and Pangode Panchayath.

Transport

Road transport 
Palode is well connected to major cities in Kerala and Tamil Nadu. Thiruvananthapuram-Thenmala SH-2 passes through Palode. Kerala state road transport corporation have a bus depot in Palode connects major towns and villages in Thiruvananthapuram and Kollam District. Palode can be reached by roads from most parts of Kerala. MC Road (State Highway 1) connected by Karette-Kallara-Palode bus route.

 Thiruvananthapuram city 
 Nedumangad 
 Kollam 
 Thenmala 
 Tenkasi 
 Madurai 
 Thoothukudi 
 Attingal 
 Pathanamthitta

Air transport 
Nearest airport is Thiruvananthapuram International Airport (TRV) - 

Cochin International Airport - 

There is a helipad in Palode.

Rail transport 
There is no railway lines pass through Palode. Proposed Sabari railway line stations in phase -3 there will be a station in Palode. Nearest railway station near Palode are:

 Thiruvananthapuram Central Railway Station 
 Thenmala railway station 
 Punalur Railway station 
 Chirayinkil Railway Station 
 Varkala Railway Station 
 Kollam railway Station

Place of worship 
 St George Roman Catholic Latin church
 Palode Juma Masjid
 Uma Maheswara Temple Palode
 Sree Dharma Sastha Temple, Pacha
 Madan Thampuran Temple
CSI Palode Church
Seventh-day Adventist Church Palode
Pappanamcode Juma Masjid
St.Joseph Malankara Catholic Church Palode

Place of interest and tourism

Mankayam ecotourism

Mankayam is one of the popular eco-tourism spots in Kerala. From the mighty hill ranges of Chemunchi emanates the Chittar Rivar flowing down through the forest, creating a tributary in the form of the Mankayam River. The various picturesque milky cascades are the major tourist attractions at Mankayam. Among the two waterfalls are the Kalakayam and Kurissadi which among the biggest waterfalls in southern Kerala. The state forest department has come up with exclusive trekking options and special mention must given to the Iruthala Moola and Varayadin Mottai Trails.

Brimore tourism
Brimore Marigold Estate is a 900-acre tea,rubber and coffee estate  from Palode town it was established by British in 1880.

The forest check post at Mankayam waterfalls requires a payment of Rs 25 per vehicle. Most attractions near Brimore
Ayyappa temple - An old termite mound converted into a granite temple
Brimore Tea Factory - One of the oldest tea factories in Kerala
Madame Falls -  inside the Brimore estate
Ramayana Cave - A stream originates from the cave
Seetha waterfalls - Safe for bathing a natural bathtub.
Braemore Estate Bungalow
Braemore Palace
Braemore Hills

Lower Meenmutty Hydel Tourism Centre, Nanniyode 

The lower Meenmutty Hydel Tourism project is the only project working under KSEB in the southern Kerala.

The center is surrounded by forest, on the shores of the Vamanapuram river. Boating is a common activity at this destination. Another attraction is the garden. Lower Meenmutty Hydel tourism centre has an amusement zone for children and boating, namely pedal boats and slow boats. There is a small dam in lower Meenmutty Hydel.

Jawaharlal Nehru Tropical Botanical Garden 

KSCSTE-Jawaharlal Nehru Tropical Botanic Garden and Research Institute (KSCSTE - JNTBGRI) was found in 1979 with the objective of establishing a Conservatory Botanic Garden of tropical plant resources in general and of the country and the Kerala state in particular. It also undertakes research programmes for the sustainable utilization of the resources. The idea of establishing the institute was conceived soon after the first United Nations Conference on human Environment, held in Stockholm in 1972 by the Founder Director, the late Professor A. Abraham and its became his commitment to conserve the waning tropical plant species of India. Consequently, the institute was established as an autonomous R&D organization by the Government of Kerala in 1979.

In 1996 Saraswathy Thangavelu Extension Centre of KSCSTE - JNTBGRI housing the Bioinformatics component become functioning. During the year 2003, JNTBGRI was bought under the newly formed society, Kerala State Council for Science, Technology and Environment (KSCSTE).

KSCSTE - JNTBGRI is the only organization in India, which maintains a 300-acre conservatory garden for the wild tropical plant genetic resources of the country, besides a well integrated multidisciplinary R & D system dealing with conservation, management and sustainable utilization of tropical plant resources. During the past 30 years, it has flourished into one of the premier R & D organization in Asia, devoted to conservation and sustainable utilization of tropical plant diversity. The institute is recognized as a ‘National Centre of Excellence in ex situ conservation and sustainable utilization of tropical plants diversity’ by the Minister of Environment and Forests, Government of India and the Centre of Science and Technology of Non-Aligned and other Developing Countries (NAM S&T Centre) JNTBGRI enjoys the membership of Botanic Gardens Conservation International (BGCI). The institute is arecognized centre of research for post graduate and doctoral research of several universities, within the country.

Climate 
Palode has a climate that lies on the border between a tropical savanna climate (Köppen Aw) and a tropical monsoon climate (Am). As a result, its only distinct seasons relate to rainfall rather than temperature. The humidity is high and rises to about 75% during the monsoon season. Palode has south-west monsoons and gets its first showers in early June. Palode gets rain from the receding north-east monsoons which hit the October. The dry season sets in by December.

Educational institutions 

 Iqbal College
 Allama Iqbal Institute of Management (MBA)

 Crescent Central School, Panangode, Palode
 Jawahar Navodaya Vidyalaya, Chettachal
 S.K.V Higher Secondary School, Pacha
 N.S.S Higher Secondary School
 Dr Ambedkar Vidya Niketan CBSE Model School, Njaraneeli

Health care

Government Community Health Centre 

Govt. Community Health Centre is well-equipped clinic with all the modern equipment. The clinic has separate waiting and consultation areas which allow enough space for patients to wait conveniently at the clinic. Being a specialized hospital, the doctor offers a number of medical services. The clinic is operational between 00:00 - 23:59.

Brothers Medical Centre 
Brothers Medical Centre And Diagnostic Services is a recognized name in patient care. They are one of the well-known Hospitals in Palode. Located in, this hospital is easily accessible by various means of transport. A team of well-trained medical staff, non-medical staff and experienced clinical technicians work round-the-clock to offer various services. A team of doctors on board, including specialists are equipped with the knowledge and expertise for handling various types of medical cases.

Government institutions
Jawaharlal Nehru Tropical Botanic Garden & Research Institute 
Kerala State Bharat Scouts and Guides Centre
Institute of Animal Health&Veterinary Biological Institute
Chief Disease Investigation Office

 Indian Institute Of Oil Palm Research Center(ICAR)
Government community Health Centre.
Palode Police Station (Circle)
Kerala State Road Transportation Corporation Palode.
Palode Forest Range Office.
Integrated Child Development Services (ICDS)
PWD Guest House Palode
Shanthi kudeeram government public crematorium
Tribal employment exchange career development center and model samanwaya center
India's first tribal employment exchange

Economy 
Palode is predominantly an agriculture-dependent village and most of the people have directly or indirectly been involved in agriculture for their livelihood. With the spread of rubber cultivations in the 1970s and 1980s in the eastern regions of Kerala, farmers of Palode quickly moved over from Coconut and Paddy cultivations to Rubber, attracted by its high Return on Investment. In the 1990s, a lot of village youth traveled to the Middle East countries in search of jobs and, by now, a good number of adults from the village is working abroad and, therefore, remittance is also a good source of income. Flow of remittance has resulted in increase in the number of concrete buildings, replacing the old thatched and tiled houses.

History

Palode Mela 
Started as a livestock fair in 1962, transformed into a Grameen Mela held for 10 days.

Palode Mela one of the traditional agricultural trade fare that has been started since 1962. Now it flourished the national fest of south kerala. February 7 to 16 people celebrate this Mela .More than 50000 peoples visits per year this Mela. When the period of cattles rolled the economic position of society, before the time of globalization and economic liberation, the farmers started this mela as a trade fare.

References

External links

Villages in Thiruvananthapuram district